Egchel is a village in the Dutch province of Limburg. It is a part of the municipality of Peel en Maas, and lies about 14 km north of Roermond.

The village was first mentioned in 1405 as Heynchen van Aygel. The etymology is unknown.

Egchel was home to 195 people in 1840. The Catholic St Jacobus de Meerdere Church was built in 1948.

References

Populated places in Limburg (Netherlands)
Peel en Maas